Brian Keith Barnes (born March 25, 1967) is a former Major League Baseball left-handed pitcher who played from 1990 to 1994 with the Montreal Expos, Cleveland Indians, and Los Angeles Dodgers.

Barnes attended Clemson University. In 1988 he played collegiate summer baseball with the Orleans Cardinals of the Cape Cod Baseball League and was named a league all-star. He was selected by the Expos in the 4th round of the 1989 MLB Draft.

References

External links

1967 births
Living people
Albuquerque Dukes players
All-American college baseball players
American expatriate baseball players in Canada
Baseball players from North Carolina
Calgary Cannons players
Charlotte Knights players
Clemson Tigers baseball players
Orleans Firebirds players
Greenville Braves players
Indianapolis Indians players
Jacksonville Expos players
Jamestown Expos players
Los Angeles Dodgers players
Major League Baseball pitchers
Memphis Redbirds players
Montreal Expos players
Pawtucket Red Sox players
Toledo Mud Hens players
West Palm Beach Expos players